Feyenoord Academy may refer to:

Feyenoord Academy (Varkenoord), Dutch football academy
Feyenoord Ghana, Ghanaian football academy